India de Beaufort (born India Beaufort Lloyd; 27 June 1987) is a British actress and singer.

Early life
de Beaufort is of British and Indian background. Her maternal grandfather was born in Calcutta, where his family lived for around 350 years. She has stated that her surname, de Beaufort, comes from distant French ancestry. She attended Esher College in Surrey, England.

Career

In 1994, de Beaufort appeared in a music video, "Every Woman Knows", for the artist Lulu, and in 1996 had a brief appearance as an orphan child in an episode of Penelope Keith's Next of Kin.

In 2002, aged 15, de Beaufort signed to Entertainment Rights as a singer-songwriter and actress. In the same year she was cast as a principal character in the BAFTA nominated The Basil Brush Show as India Beau. De Beaufort went on to shoot three seasons with the show, and also performed as a featured artist on the Christmas single "Boom Boom, Its Basil Brush". The song remained on the UK Singles Chart for two weeks at position 44. During de Beaufort's time with the cast of the CBBC sitcom, she performed at Proms in the Park and took part in a nationwide tour.

In 2006, de Beaufort was cast as Maya in Simon Pegg's Run Fatboy Run, directed by David Schwimmer. She has said that this production switched her path from singer to actress. In 2008, de Beaufort was cast as the pagan warrior Aneka in BBC/Comedy Central parody series, Kröd Mändoon and the Flaming Sword of Fire. The comedy was shot in Budapest, Hungary.

In 2009, de Beaufort joined the cast of The CW teen drama series One Tree Hill as Miranda Stone during the seventh season.

From 2010 to 2012, de Beaufort played India Jourdain in the ABC Family comedy-drama series Jane by Design. She later had the recurring roles in Necessary Roughness and Chicago P.D. She also guest starred on Chuck, How I Met Your Mother, Castle and The Night Shift. From 2014 to 2017, de Beaufort did her first voice role as Clover in the Netflix show All Hail King Julien.

In 2015, de Beaufort was cast as Jules Jackman in the ABC prime-time television soap opera Blood & Oil. In 2016, de Beaufort was cast in recurring roles on Younger and NCIS: Los Angeles. She also guest starred on 2 Broke Girls. In 2017, de Beaufort joined the cast of Veep. She was also cast in the ABC pilot The Gospel of Kevin, later changed to Kevin (Probably) Saves the World; it was picked up to series and premiered on 3 October 2017. From 2019-2020 She appeared on 7 episodes of One Day At A Time. A remake of Norman Lear's classic sitcom. She played Avery, Schneider's (Todd Grinnel) girlfriend.  Who is actually her real life husband. 

As of 2023, she stars as assistant district attorney Olivia Moore in the Night Court revival series.

Personal life
On 29 August 2015, de Beaufort married actor Todd Grinnell. They have a son together, Crosby James (b. 2018).

Filmography

Film

Television

Video games

Discography

Singles

References

External links

 

1987 births
Living people
People educated at Tolworth Girls' School
People from Surrey
English voice actresses
English television actresses
21st-century English women singers
21st-century English singers
English people of Indian descent